County Dublin was a constituency represented in the Irish House of Commons until 1801.

History
In the Patriot Parliament of 1689 summoned by James II, Dublin County was represented by two members.

Members of Parliament

Parliaments of Henry VIII
1536 Patrick Barnewall

Parliaments of Elizabeth I

1568 Sir Christopher Barnewall
1585 Richard Netterville
1585 Henry Burnell
1585 Nicholas Ball

Parliaments of James I
1613 Sir Christopher Plunket
1613 Thomas Luttrell of Luttrellstown

Parliaments of Charles I
1634  Nicholas Barnewall and Thomas Luttrell (died and replaced by Peter Barnewall)
1639  Nicholas Barnewall (ennobled 1647 and replaced by Sir Thomas Armstrong) and Peter Barnewall (expelled for non-attendance - replaced 1642 by  Sir John Sherlock)

Protectorate Parliament
1654–55: John Hewson
1656–58: John Bysse
1659: Sir Theophilus Jones

Charles II
1661 Sir William Domville and Sir William Ussher

1692–1801

Notes

References

Bibliography

Constituencies of the Parliament of Ireland (pre-1801)
Historic constituencies in County Dublin
1800 disestablishments in Ireland
Constituencies disestablished in 1800